The Isle of Wight Saturday League is a football competition based on the Isle of Wight, England. There are currently two divisions for first teams, known as Division One and Division Two, plus two for reserve teams (Combination One and Two). Winner of the league may be eligible for promotion to the Wessex League.

Member clubs 2022–23

Division One
 Bembridge
 Binstead & County Old Boys
 Brading Town
 Cowes Sports Reserves
 East Cowes Sports
 Northwood St. John's
 Oakfield 
 Pan Community
 Ryde Saints
 Sandown
 Shanklin
 Vectis
 West Wight
 Whitecroft & Barton Sports

Division Two
 AFC Wootton
 Carisbrooke United
 East Cowes Vics Reserves
 High Park
 Newchurch
 Niton
 Osborne Coburg
 Seaview
 Ventnor
 Yarmouth & Calbourne

External links
Yellow Jersey page
FA Full-Time page

 
Football on the Isle of Wight
Football leagues in England